lo
This is a list of characters that have appeared on the ABC Daytime and TOLN soap opera, One Life to Live.

A

B

C

D

E

F

G

H

J

K

L

M

N

O

P

R

S

T

V

W

Y

Z

See also
 One Life to Live characters (1968–79)
 One Life to Live characters (1980s)
 One Life to Live characters (1990s)
 One Life to Live characters (2000s)
 One Life to Live characters (2010s)

References

Notes

External links